The Roblar Fire was a wildfire that burned on Camp Pendleton, San Diego County, California during July 2016. The fire was fully contained on July 30 after burning .

References 

2016 California wildfires
Wildfires in San Diego County, California